The Concretes is the debut studio album by Swedish indie pop band The Concretes. It was first released in Sweden on 2 May 2003 by Licking Fingers, and was released internationally in 2004.

Track listing

Personnel
The Concretes
Victoria Bergsman
Maria Eriksson
Martin Hansson
Ulrik Karlsson
Lisa Milsberg
Per Nyström
Ludvig Rylander
Daniel Värjö

Additional personnel
Erik Bünger – backing vocals
Nicolai Dunger – backing vocals
Jari Haapalainen – percussion, mandolin
Tomas Hallonsten – piano
Malte Homberg – backing vocals
Christian Hörgren – cello and string arrangements
Irene Kastner – harp
Peter Nyhlin – backing vocals
Anne Pajunen – viola
Thomas Ringquist – viola
Anna Rodell – violin
Jonna Sandell – violin

Charts

Release history

References

External links
Official site
Label site

The Concretes albums
2003 debut albums
Astralwerks albums